Coalition is a 2015 British television film about the formation of a coalition government following the 2010 United Kingdom general election. It was broadcast on Channel 4 on 28 March 2015, shortly before that year's general election. The film was written by James Graham and starred Bertie Carvel as Nick Clegg, Ian Grieve as Gordon Brown, and Mark Dexter as David Cameron. Graham wrote the film in the aim of giving humanity and enabling empathy to all of the figures portrayed within it, which earned it positive reviews from critics.

Plot

Nick Clegg is popular with the electorate ahead of the 2010 general election, with his Liberal Democrat party promising electoral reform and an end to the dominance of the two main parties, Labour and Conservative, who had led every British government in almost 90 years. The election results in a hung parliament with no party having a majority of seats: the Conservatives have the most, then the governing Labour, and then the Liberal Democrats. Nick is disappointed that his popularity did not reflect in the results, but is consoled by his party's former leader, Paddy Ashdown.

As the party with the most seats, the Conservatives led by David Cameron are given the first choice to form a government, which will either be a minority government or a coalition with the Liberal Democrats. Conservative peers are vehemently opposed to working with the Liberal Democrats due to what they see to be contrasting policies, but Shadow Chancellor George Osborne tells David that if they ally with them, it would put the Tories into a centrist position and potentially make them more electable for the next general election. Meanwhile, Labour, led by incumbent Prime Minister Gordon Brown, prepare for negotiations with the Liberal Democrats. Gordon points out to Nick that both parties are left-wing and progressive, but Nick is held back by the personal unpopularity of Brown amongst the British public.

Liberal Democrat MPs meet with their Conservative counterparts to negotiate a possible government, discussing the possibility of a referendum on electoral reform. Conservative peers are furious with Cameron on this proposal, stating that reform would end any future possibility of a Conservative majority government. However, he convinces them by saying that a Labour—Liberal Democrat coalition would pass electoral reform without a referendum, as both parties support it. In another meeting, Gordon tries to win over Nick by promising to resign during their first term in government, but Nick wants it sooner.

Gordon resigns for the good of his party and to leave in a dignified way, strategically forcing David Cameron into becoming Prime Minister in a minority government. Nick is adamant to form a coalition as he sees Labour as unpopular. His MPs are angry with the possibility of a coalition with the Conservatives, due to the opposition between the two parties. However, Paddy Ashdown makes a speech saying that this is the best opportunity for the party to enter government and execute their policies. The Conservatives and Liberal Democrats form a coalition.

Cast

Production
The film was written by James Graham, who also scripted This House, a National Theatre play about the government of James Callaghan from 1976 to 1979. Graham chose to dramatise the formation of the government in 2010 because "The personalities, clashes, the farcical nature of some of it, the loss of dignity – it was characterful and weird. The lack of sleep, the pressure, and exhaustion make it exciting ... It's really important to me to try and humanise them". He stated that the message of the film was not to change political opinions, but to encourage empathy towards politicians because "There's this presumption that they're all corrupt and incompetent – but I'd love people to empathise with the incredible situation".

The film was sponsored by Japanese car manufacturer Lexus.

Reception
Kasia Delgado of Radio Times praised the film for managing "to make the most powerful men in the country seem both ridiculous, and entirely human", calling it "like The Thick of It on valium".

In the New Statesman, Anoosh Chakelian wrote that it "starts off as satire and ends as an opera. It is the young playwright's eye for detail and evident reams of source material that allow for such an astute commentary, and human portrayal", while also being "masterfully unbiased; the one clear lesson to the audience is that our politicians are humans". She singled out the best performance to be Gatiss as Mandelson, as the "darkly frivolous" performance "has the macabre silliness spot on".

Lucy Mangan of The Guardian stated that her opinion of the film was prejudiced by opinions on the politicians portrayed within it, but wrote that  it gave a new image to them when "bloodless freaks began to swell with life and humanity".

When commenting on the actors, GQ writer Ian McGurk praised the range of the portrayal of Brown by Grieve but reserved highest praise for Mark Dexter as Cameron, citing Dexter's striking physical similarity to the real Cameron and adding that "He also gives the best performance".

See also
Ballot Monkeys, Channel 4 sitcom broadcast during the same season
UKIP: The First 100 Days, Channel 4 mockumentary broadcast during the same season
Newzoids, series 1 ran during the same season

References

External links
Coalition on Channel 4

2010 United Kingdom general election
British drama television films
British political drama films
2015 television films
2015 films
Channel 4 television dramas
Channel 4 television films
2015 in British television
Cultural depictions of Gordon Brown
Cultural depictions of David Cameron
Nick Clegg
Films set in 2010
Films about elections
George Osborne